Josef Pfundheller (22 May 1813 – 26 February 1889) was an Austrian writer and journalist, who also appeared as a playwright of the .

Life 
Born in Vienna, Pfundheller joined the Catholic literary movement in Austria at an early stage, and from 1840 onwards he worked as a journalist for various major Viennese newspapers, such as the Österreichische Morgenblatt. From 1872 he worked as an editor at the Wiener Gemeinde-Zeitung, and in 1886/87 he was publisher and chief editor of the Österreichischen Reichsboten.

Since 1848, Pfundheller published book editions of his literary works, which often referred to historical themes. He also wrote several stage plays as theatre poet.

Pfundheller died in Vienna at the age of 75.

Work

Plays

Publications 
 Ein Gang durch die Vorzeit, historische Novellen, Verlag J.J. Busch, Vienna 1846
 Novellen und Erzählungen, zwei Bände, Verlag Pichler, Vienna 1848
 Der Preßproceß: "Presse contra Kirchenzeitung", Verlag C. Wendelin, Vienna 1859
 Der österreichische Angelfischer oder die Kunst des Angelns, Verlag Manz, Vienna 1861
 Die schwarze Bibliothek – eine Sammlung interessanter Criminalgeschichten mit Benützung authentischer Quellen, five volumes, Verlag Bamarski & Dittmarsch, Vienna 1861–1863
 Die Kinder des Fluchs, Roman aus dem Wiener Leben, self-published by the author, Vienna 1873
 Der Blumenkaiser – Oesterreichisches Zeit- und Culturbild, Verlag Manz, Vienna 1881
 Spaziergänge mit der Angel an der "obern" Donau, self-published by the author, Vienna 1882
 Aus dem Oesterreicher-Urlande, subtitle: Zur Erinnerung an den Sommeraufenthalt in Ardagger 1883, Vienna 1883
 Französisch-Oesterreichisch – geschichtliches Zeitbild, Biography, Verlag J. Koblischek, Vienna 1888
 Letzte Justifizierung einer weiblichen Person bei der Spinnerin am Kreuz am Wienerberge, self-published by the author, Vienna 1898 (posthum)

Lieder 
 Sehnsucht. Wanderlust, together with Carl Binder and Johann Nepomuk Vogl, year unknown

Further reading

References 

19th-century Austrian writers
Austrian journalists
1813 births
1889 deaths
Writers from Vienna